Astragalus soxmaniorum, commonly called Soxman's milkvetch, is a species of plant in the pea family that is native to Texas, Louisiana and Arkansas in the United States of America.

References

Flora of North America
soxmaniorum